Ilýa Tamurkin (born 9 May 1989) is a Turkmenistani professional footballer who plays for FC Ahal in the Ýokary Liga and the Turkmenistan national football team, as a midfielder.

Club career
Professional career began at Merw FK.

He spent the season of 2018 for the FC Alga Bishkek in the championship of Kyrgyzstan.

In 2019, he returned to Turkmenistan, again becoming a FC Merw player.

In January 2020, he joined the Ýokary Liga vice-champion FC Ahal.

International career
Tamurkin made his senior national team debut on 22 May 2014, in an 2014 AFC Challenge Cup match against Afghanistan. He was included in Turkmenistan's squad for the 2019 AFC Asian Cup in the United Arab Emirates.

Personal life
Tamurkin is an ethnic Russian-Tatar.

References

External links
 
 

1989 births
People from Mary, Turkmenistan
Living people
Turkmenistan footballers
Association football midfielders
Turkmenistan people of Tatar descent
Turkmenistan people of Russian descent
Footballers at the 2010 Asian Games
2019 AFC Asian Cup players
Asian Games competitors for Turkmenistan
Turkmenistan expatriate sportspeople in Kyrgyzstan
Kyrgyz Premier League players
FC Alga Bishkek players
FC Ahal players
Turkmenistan international footballers